The 2017 Fort Worth mayoral election took place on May 6, 2017, to elect the mayor of Fort Worth, Texas. The election was officially non-partisan.

Betsy Price, who was serving her third term, ran for reelection. She handily won reelection with over 70% of the vote.

Results

References

Fort Worth
Fort Worth
2017
Non-partisan elections